Giardiasis is a parasitic disease caused by Giardia duodenalis (also known as G. lamblia and G. intestinalis). Infected individuals who experience symptoms (about 10% have no symptoms) may have diarrhea, abdominal pain, and weight loss. Less common symptoms include vomiting and blood in the stool. Symptoms usually begin 1 to 3 weeks after exposure and, without treatment, may last two to six weeks or longer.

Giardiasis usually spreads when Giardia duodenalis cysts within feces contaminate food or water that is later consumed orally. The disease can also spread between people and through other animals. Cysts may survive for nearly three months in cold water. Giardiasis is diagnosed via stool tests.

Prevention may be improved through proper hygiene practices. Asymptomatic cases often do not need treatment. When symptoms are present, treatment is typically provided with either tinidazole or metronidazole. Infection may cause a person to become lactose intolerant, so it is recommended to temporarily avoid lactose following an infection. Resistance to treatment may occur in some patients.

Giardiasis occurs worldwide. It is one of the most common parasitic human diseases. Infection rates are as high as 7% in the developed world and 30% in the developing world. In 2013, there were approximately 280 million people worldwide with symptomatic cases of giardiasis. The World Health Organization classifies giardiasis as a neglected disease. It is popularly known as beaver fever in North America.

Signs and symptoms
Symptoms vary from none to severe diarrhea with poor absorption of nutrients. The cause of this wide range in severity of symptoms is not fully known but the intestinal flora of the infected host may play a role. Diarrhea is less likely to occur in people from developing countries.

Symptoms typically develop 9–15 days after exposure, but may occur as early as one day. The most common and prominent symptom is chronic diarrhea, which can occur for weeks or months if untreated. Diarrhea is often greasy and foul-smelling, with a tendency to float. This characteristic diarrhea is often accompanied by a number of other symptoms, including gas, abdominal cramps, and nausea or vomiting. Some people also experience symptoms outside of the gastrointestinal tract, such as itchy skin, hives, and swelling of the eyes and joints, although these are less common. Fever occurs in only about 15% of people, in spite of the nickname "beaver fever".

Prolonged disease is often characterized by diarrhea, along with malabsorption of nutrients in the intestine. This malabsorption results in fatty stools, substantial weight loss, and fatigue. Additionally, those with giardiasis often have difficulty absorbing lactose, vitamin A, folate, and vitamin B12. In children, prolonged giardiasis can cause failure to thrive and may impair mental development. Symptomatic infections are well recognized as causing lactose intolerance, which, while usually temporary, may become permanent.

Cause
Giardiasis is caused by the protozoan Giardia duodenalis. The infection occurs in many animals, including beavers, other rodents, cows, and sheep. Animals are believed to play a role in keeping infections present in an environment.

G. duodenalis has been sub-classified into eight genetic assemblages (designated A–H). Genotyping of G. duodenalis isolated from various hosts has shown that assemblages A and B infect the largest range of host species, and appear to be the main and possibly only G. duodenalis assemblages that infect humans.

Risk factors
According to the United States Centers for Disease Control and Prevention (CDC), people at greatest risk of infection are:
 People in childcare settings
 People who are in close contact with someone who has the disease
 Travelers within areas that have poor sanitation
 People who have contact with feces during sexual activity
 Backpackers or campers who drink untreated water from springs, lakes, or rivers
 Swimmers who swallow water from swimming pools, hot tubs, interactive fountains, or untreated recreational water from springs, lakes, or rivers
 People who get their household water from a shallow well
 People with weakened immune systems
 People who have contact with infected animals or animal environments contaminated with feces

Factors that increase infection risk for people from developed countries include changing diapers, consuming raw food, owning a dog, and travelling in the developing world. However, 75% of infections in the United Kingdom are acquired in the UK, not through travel elsewhere. In the United States, giardiasis occurs more often in summer, which is believed to be due to a greater amount of time spent on outdoor activities and traveling in the wilderness.

Transmission
Giardiasis is transmitted via the fecal-oral route with the ingestion of cysts. Primary routes are personal contact and contaminated water and food. The cysts can stay infectious for up to three months in cold water.

Many people with Giardia infections have no or few symptoms. They may, however, still spread the disease.

Pathophysiology

The life cycle of Giardia consists of a cyst form and a trophozoite form. The cyst form is infectious and once it has found a host, transforms into the trophozoite form. This trophozoite attaches to the intestinal wall and replicates within the gut.  As trophozoites continue along the gastrointestinal tract, they convert back to their cyst form which is then excreted with feces. Ingestion of only a few of these cysts is needed to generate infection in another host.

Infection with Giardia results in decreased expression of brush border enzymes, morphological changes to the microvillus, increased intestinal permeability, and programmed cell death of small intestinal epithelial cells. Both trophozoites and cysts are contained within the gastrointestinal tract and do not invade beyond it.

The attachment of trophozoites causes villous flattening and inhibition of enzymes that break down disaccharide sugars in the intestines. Ultimately, the community of microorganisms that lives in the intestine may overgrow and may be the cause of further symptoms, though this idea has not been fully investigated. The alteration of the villi leads to an inability of nutrient and water absorption from the intestine, resulting in diarrhea, one of the predominant symptoms. In the case of asymptomatic giardiasis, there can be malabsorption with or without histological changes to the small intestine. The degree to which malabsorption occurs in symptomatic and asymptomatic cases is highly varied.

The species Giardia intestinalis uses enzymes that break down proteins to attack the villi of the brush border and appears to increase crypt cell proliferation and crypt length of crypt cells existing on the sides of the villi. On an immunological level, activated host T lymphocytes attack endothelial cells that have been injured in order to remove the cell. This occurs after the disruption of proteins that connect brush border endothelial cells to one another. The result is increased intestinal permeability.

There appears to be a further increase in programmed enterocyte cell death by Giardia intestinalis, which further damages the intestinal barrier and increases permeability. There is significant upregulation of the programmed cell death cascade by the parasite, and, furthermore, substantial downregulation of the anti-apoptotic protein Bcl-2 and upregulation of the proapoptotic protein Bax. These connections suggest a role of caspase-dependent apoptosis in the pathogenesis of giardiasis.

Giardia protects its own growth by reducing the formation of the gas nitric oxide by consuming all local arginine, which is the amino acid necessary to make nitric oxide. Arginine starvation is known to be a cause of programmed cell death, and local removal is a strong apoptotic agent.

Host defense 
Host defense against Giardia consists of natural barriers, production of nitric oxide, and activation of the innate and adaptive immune systems.

Natural barriers 
Natural barriers defend against parasite entering the host's body. Natural barriers consist of mucus layers, bile salt, proteases, and lipases. Additionally, peristalsis and the renewal of enterocytes provide further protection against parasites.

Nitric oxide production 
Nitric oxide does not kill the parasite, but it inhibits the growth of trophozoites as well as excystation and encystation.

Innate immune system

Lectin pathway of complement 
The lectin pathway of complement is activated by mannose-binding lectin (MBL) which binds to N-acetylglucosamine. N-acetylglucosamine is a ligand for MBL and is present on the surface of Giardia.

The classical pathway of complement 
The classical pathway of complement is activated by antibodies specific against Giardia.

Adaptive immune system

Antibodies 
Antibodies inhibit parasite replication and also induce parasite death via the classical pathway of complement.

Infection with Giardia typically results in a strong antibody response against the parasite. While IgG is made in significant amounts, IgA is believed to be more important in parasite control. IgA is the most abundant isotype in intestinal secretions, and it is also the dominant isotype in mother's milk. Antibodies in mother's milk protect children against giardiasis (passive immunization).

T cells 
The major aspect of adaptive immune responses is the T cell response. Giardia is an extracellular pathogen. Therefore CD4+ helper T cells are primarily responsible for this protective effect.

One role of helper T cells is to promote antibody production and isotype switching. Other roles include cytokine production (Il-4,IL-9) to help recruit other effector cells of the immune response.

Diagnosis

 According to the CDC, detection of antigens on the surface of organisms in stool specimens is the current test of choice for diagnosis of giardiasis and provides increased sensitivity over more common microscopy techniques.
 A trichrome stain of preserved stool is another method used to detect Giardia.
 Microscopic examination of the stool can be performed for diagnosis.  This method is not preferred, however, due to inconsistent shedding of trophozoites and cysts in infected hosts.  Multiple samples over a period of time, typically one week, must be examined.
 The Entero-Test uses a gelatin capsule with an attached thread. One end is attached to the inner aspect of the host's cheek, and the capsule is swallowed. Later, the thread is withdrawn and shaken in saline to release trophozoites which can be detected with a microscope. The sensitivity of this test is low, however, and is not routinely used for diagnosis.
 Immunologic enzyme-linked immunosorbent assay (ELISA) testing may be used for diagnosis. These tests are capable of a 90% detection rate or more.

Although hydrogen breath tests indicate poorer rates of carbohydrate absorption in those asymptomatically infected, such tests are not diagnostic of infection.  Serological tests are not helpful in diagnosis.

Prevention
The CDC recommends hand-washing and avoiding potentially contaminated food and untreated water.

Boiling water contaminated with Giardia effectively kills infectious cysts. Chemical disinfectants or filters may be used. Iodine-based disinfectants are preferred over chlorination as the latter is ineffective at destroying cysts.

Although the evidence linking the drinking of water in the North American wilderness and giardiasis has been questioned, a number of studies raise concern. Most if not all CDC verified backcountry giardiasis outbreaks have been attributed to water. Surveillance data (for 2013 and 2014) reports six outbreaks (96 cases) of waterborne giardiasis contracted from rivers, streams or springs and less than 1% of reported giardiasis cases are associated with outbreaks.

Person-to-person transmission accounts for the majority of Giardia infections, and is usually associated with poor hygiene and sanitation. Giardia is often found on the surface of the ground, in the soil, in undercooked foods, and in water, and on hands that have not been properly cleaned after handling infected feces.  Water-borne transmission is associated with the ingestion of contaminated water. In the U.S., outbreaks typically occur in small water systems using inadequately treated surface water. Venereal transmission happens through fecal-oral contamination. Additionally, diaper changing and inadequate handwashing are risk factors for transmission from infected children. Lastly, food-borne epidemics of Giardia have developed through the contamination of food by infected food-handlers.

Vaccine 
There are no vaccines for humans yet, however there are several vaccine candidates in development. They are targeting: recombinant proteins, DNA vaccine, variant-specific surface proteins (VSP), cyst wall proteins (CWP), giadins and enzymes.

At present, one commercially available vaccine exists – GiardiaVax, made from G. lamblia whole trophozoite lysate. It is a vaccine for veterinary use only in dogs and cats. GiardiaVax should promote production of specific antibodies.

Treatment
Treatment is not always necessary as the infection usually resolves on its own. However, if the illness is acute or symptoms persist and medications are needed to treat it, a nitroimidazole medication is used such as metronidazole, tinidazole, secnidazole or ornidazole.

The World Health Organization and Infectious Disease Society of America recommend metronidazole as first line therapy. The US CDC lists metronidazole, tinidazole, and nitazoxanide as effective first-line therapies; of these three, only nitazoxanide and tinidazole are approved for the treatment of giardiasis by the US FDA. A meta-analysis published by the Cochrane Collaboration in 2012 found that compared to the standard of metronidazole, albendazole had equivalent efficacy while having fewer side effects, such as gastrointestinal or neurologic issues. Other meta-analyses have reached similar conclusions. Both medications need a five to 10 day long course; albendazole is taken once a day, while metronidazole needs to be taken three times a day. The evidence for comparing metronidazole to other alternatives such as mebendazole, tinidazole or nitazoxanide was felt to be of very low quality. While tinidazole has side effects and efficacy similar to those of metronidazole, it is administered with a single dose.

Resistance has been seen clinically to both nitroimidazoles and albendazole, but not nitazoxanide, though nitazoxanide resistance has been induced in research laboratories. The exact mechanism of resistance to all of these medications is not well understood. In the case of nitroimidazole-resistant strains of Giardia, other drugs are available which have showed efficacy in treatment including quinacrine, nitazoxanide, bacitracin zinc, furazolidone and paromomycin. Mepacrine may also be used for refractory cases.

Probiotics, when given in combination with the standard treatment, has been shown to assist with clearance of Giardia.

During pregnancy, paromomycin is the preferred treatment drug because of its poor intestinal absorption, resulting in less exposure to the fetus. Alternatively, metronidazole can be used after the first trimester as there has been wide experience in its use for trichomonas in pregnancy.

Prognosis
In people with a properly functioning immune system, infection may resolve without medication. A small portion, however, develop a chronic infection. People with an impaired immune system are at higher risk of chronic infection. Medication is an effective cure for nearly all people although there is growing drug-resistance.

Children with chronic giardiasis are at risk for failure to thrive as well as more long-lasting sequelae such as growth stunting. Up to half of infected people develop a temporary lactose intolerance leading symptoms that may mimic a chronic infection. Some people experience post-infectious irritable bowel syndrome after the infection has cleared. Giardiasis has also been implicated in the development of food allergies. This is thought to be due to its effect on intestinal permeability.

Epidemiology

In some developing countries Giardia is present in 30% of the population. In the United States it is estimated that it is present in 3–7% of the population.

The number of reported cases in the United States in 2018 was 15,584. All states that classify giardiasis as a notifiable disease had cases of giardiasis. The states of Illinois, Kentucky, Mississippi, North Carolina, Oklahoma, Tennessee, Texas, and Vermont did not notify the Center for Disease Control regarding cases in 2018. The states with the highest number of cases in 2018 were California, New York, Florida, and Wisconsin. There are seasonal trends associated with giardiasis. July, August, and September are the months with the highest incidence of giardiasis in the United States.

In the ECDC's (European Centre for Disease Prevention and Control) annual epidemiological report containing 2014 data, 17,278 confirmed giardiasis cases were reported by 23 of the 31 countries that are members of the EU/EEA. Germany reported the highest number at 4,011 cases. Following Germany, the UK reported 3,628 confirmed giardiasis cases. Together, this accounts for 44% of total reported cases.

Research
Some intestinal parasitic infections may play a role in irritable bowel syndrome and other long-term sequelae such as chronic fatigue. The mechanism of transformation from cyst to trophozoites has not been characterized but may be helpful in developing drug targets for treatment-resistant Giardia. The interaction between Giardia and host immunity, internal flora, and other pathogens is not well understood.

The main congress about giardiasis is the "International Giardia and Cryptosporidium Conference" (IGCC). A summary of results presented at the most recent edition (2019, in Rouen, France) is available.

Other animals
In both dogs and cats, giardiasis usually responds to metronidazole and fenbendazole. Metronidazole in pregnant cats can cause developmental malformations. Many cats dislike the taste of fenbendazole. Giardiasis has been shown to decrease weight in livestock.

References

External links 
 Giardiasis Fact Sheet

Protozoal diseases
Waterborne diseases
Animal diseases
Tropical diseases
Zoonoses
Feces
Wikipedia medicine articles ready to translate
Wikipedia infectious disease articles ready to translate